The Plural Left is a political party in the French overseas department of Guadeloupe. The party has one seat in the French National Assembly in the group of the Socialist Party.

References 

Political parties in Guadeloupe
Socialist parties in Guadeloupe